Marie Taglioni, Comtesse de Voisins  (23 April 1804 – 22 April 1884) was a Swedish-born ballet dancer of the Romantic ballet era partially of Italian descent, a central figure in the history of European dance. She spent most of her life in the Austrian Empire and France. She was one of the most celebrated ballerinas of the romantic ballet, which was cultivated primarily at Her Majesty's Theatre in London and at the Théâtre de l'Académie Royale de Musique of the Paris Opera Ballet. She is credited with (though not confirmed as) being the first ballerina to truly dance en pointe.

Early life
Taglioni was born in Stockholm, Sweden, to the Italian choreographer Filippo Taglioni and the Swedish ballet dancer Sophie Karsten, maternal granddaughter of the Swedish opera singer Christoffer Christian Karsten and of the Polish opera singer and actress Sophie Stebnowska. Her brother, Paul (1808–1884), was also a dancer and an influential choreographer; they performed together early in their careers.

Marriage
Taglioni was married to Comte Auguste Gilbert de Voisins in 1835, but separated in 1836. She later fell in love with Eugene Desmares, a loyal fan, who had defended her honour in a duel. Desmares and Taglioni gave birth to an (illegitimate) child in 1836. Three years later Desmares died in a hunting accident. In 1842 she gave birth to her second child. It is unknown who the father is even though the birth certificate states the father as Gilbert de Voisins. Taglioni's children's names were Georges Philippe Marie Gilbert de Voisins and Eugenie-Marie-Edwige Gilbert de Voisins.

Training
Taglioni moved to Vienna with her family at a very young age where she began her ballet training under the direction of Jean-Francois Coulon and her father. After Filippo was appointed the ballet master at the court opera in Vienna there was a decision that Marie would debut in the Habsburg capital. Even though Marie had trained with Coulon, her technique was not up to the standards that would impress the Viennese audiences. Her father then created a rigorous six-month training regimen for his daughter where she would hold positions for 100 counts. The training was conducted daily and consisted of two hours in the morning with difficult exercises focusing on her legs and two hours in the afternoon focusing on adagio movements that would help her refine poses in ballet. Taglioni had a rounded back that caused her to lean forward and had slightly distorted proportions. She worked hard to disguise her physical limitations by increasing range of motion and developing her strength. Taglioni focused her energy on her shape and form to the audience and less on bravura tricks and pirouettes. In Vienna, Marie danced her first ballet choreographed by her father titled "La Reception d'une Jeune Nymphe à la Cour de Terpsichore".

Career

Before joining the Paris Opéra, Taglioni danced in both Munich and Stuttgart, and at age 23 debuted in another ballet choreographed by her father called "La Sicilien" that jump-started her ballet career. Taglioni rose to fame as a danseuse at the Paris Opéra when her father created the ballet La Sylphide (1832) for her. Designed as a showcase for Taglioni's talent, it was the first ballet where dancing en pointe had an aesthetic rationale and was not merely an acrobatic stunt, often involving ungraceful arm movements and exertions, as had been the approach of dancers in the late 1820s.

Pas de Quatre

In 1837 Taglioni left the Ballet of Her Majesty's Theatre to take up a three-year contract in Saint Petersburg with the Imperial Ballet (known today as the Kirov/Mariinsky Ballet). It was in Russia after her last performance in the country (1842) and at the height of the "cult of the ballerina", that a pair of her pointe shoes were sold for two hundred rubles, reportedly to be cooked, served with a sauce and eaten by a group of balletomanes.

In July 1845, she danced with Lucile Grahn, Carlotta Grisi, and Fanny Cerrito in Jules Perrot's Pas de Quatre, a ballet representing Taglioni's ethereal qualities that was based on Alfred Edward Chalon’s lithographic prints. Pas de Quatre was originally choreographed to be presented to Queen Victoria, who attended the third performance.

Retirement, last years and death

Taglioni retired from performing in 1847; for a time she took up residence at the Ca' d'Oro on the Grand Canal in Venice. When the ballet of the Paris Opéra was reorganized on stricter, more professional lines, she was its guiding spirit. With the director of the new Conservatoire de danse, Lucien Petipa, and Petipa's former pupil, the choreographer Louis Mérante, she figured on the six-member select jury of the first annual competition for the corps de ballet, held on 13 April 1860.

Her only choreographic work was Le papillon (1860) for her student Emma Livry, who is remembered for dying in 1863 when her costume was set alight by a gas lamp used for stage lighting. Johann Strauss II composed the "Marie Taglioni Polka" (Op. 173) in honour of Marie Taglioni's niece, Marie "Paul" Taglioni, also known as "Marie the Younger". The two women, having the same name, have often been conflated, or confused with each other.

Later in England, she taught social dance and ballroom to children and society ladies in London; she also took a limited number of ballet pupils. She resided at #14 Connaught Square, London from 1875 to 1876.

Death
Taglioni died in Marseille on 22 April 1884, the day before her 80th birthday. Her body was moved to Paris. There is some debate over whether she is buried in Montmartre or in Père Lachaise, or if the grave Montmartre site belongs to her mother. The local dancers began leaving their worn pointe shoes on the Montmartre grave as a tribute and thanks to the first pointe dancer.

See also
List of dancers
Women in dance

References

Sources

Further reading
Homans, Jennifer. Apollo's Angels: A History of Ballet, Random House, 2010.
 Madison U. Sowell, Debra H. Sowell, Francesca Falcone, Patrizia Veroli, Icônes du ballet romantique. Marie Taglioni et sa famille, Gremese, 2016.
Marie Taglioni, Souvenirs. Le manuscrit inédit de la grande danseuse romantique, édition établie, présentée et annotée par Bruno Ligore, Gremese, 2017.

External links

 Marie Taglioni (1804–1884): A life on toe tip (web presentation of the Taglioni collection in the Netherlands Music Institute)

1804 births
1884 deaths
Ballet teachers
Burials at Père Lachaise Cemetery
Italian ballerinas
French countesses
Paris Opera Ballet étoiles
Prima ballerinas
Swedish ballerinas
Swedish people of Italian descent
Swedish people of Polish descent
Swedish emigrants to the Austrian Empire
Expatriates of the Austrian Empire in France
19th-century Swedish ballet dancers